FreeDOS (formerly Free-DOS and PD-DOS) is a free software operating system for IBM PC compatible computers. It intends to provide a complete MS-DOS-compatible environment for running legacy software and supporting embedded systems.

FreeDOS can be booted from a floppy disk or USB flash drive. It is designed to run well under virtualization or x86 emulation.

Unlike most versions of MS-DOS, FreeDOS is composed of free software, licensed under the terms of the GNU General Public License. However, other packages that form part of the FreeDOS project include non-GPL software considered worthy of preservation, such as 4DOS, which is distributed under a modified MIT License.

History 

The FreeDOS project began on 29 June 1994, after Microsoft announced it would no longer sell or support MS-DOS. Jim Hall – who at the time was a student – posted a manifesto proposing the development of PD-DOS, a public domain version of DOS. Within a few weeks, other programmers including Pat Villani and Tim Norman joined the project. Between them, a kernel (by Villani), the COMMAND.COM command line interpreter (by Villani and Norman), and core utilities (by Hall) were created by pooling code they had written or found available. For some time, the project was maintained by Morgan "Hannibal" Toal. There have been many official pre-release distributions of FreeDOS before the final FreeDOS 1.0 distribution. GNU/DOS, an unofficial distribution of FreeDOS, was discontinued after version 1.0 was released.

Blinky the Fish is the mascot of FreeDOS. He was designed by Bas Snabilie.

Distribution 
FreeDOS 1.1, released on 2 January 2012, is available for download as a CD-ROM image: a limited install disc that only contains the kernel and basic applications, and a full disc that contains many more applications (games, networking, development, etc.), not available  but with a newer, fuller 1.2. The legacy version 1.0 (2006) consisted of two CDs, one of which was an 8 MB install CD targeted at regular users and the other which was a larger 49 MB live CD that also held the source code of the project.

Commercial uses 
FreeDOS is used by several companies:
 Dell preloaded FreeDOS with their n-series desktops to reduce their cost. The firm has been criticized for making these machines no cheaper, and harder to buy, than identical systems with Windows.
 HP provided FreeDOS as an option in its dc5750 desktops, Mini 5101 netbooks and Probook laptops. FreeDOS is also used as bootable media for updating the BIOS firmware in HP systems.
 FreeDOS is included by Steve Gibson's hard drive maintenance and recovery program, SpinRite.
 Intel's Solid-State Drive Firmware Update Tool loaded the FreeDOS kernel.

Non-commercial uses 
FreeDOS is also used in multiple independent projects:
 FED-UP is the Floppy Enhanced DivX Universal Player.
 FUZOMA is a FreeDOS-based distribution that can boot from a floppy disk and converts older computers into educational tools for children.
 XFDOS is a FreeDOS-based distribution with a graphical user interface, porting Nano-X and FLTK.

Compatibility

Hardware 
FreeDOS requires a PC/XT machine with at least 640 kB of memory. Programs not bundled with FreeDOS often require additional system resources.

MS-DOS and Win32 console 
FreeDOS is mostly compatible with MS-DOS. It supports COM executables, standard DOS executables and Borland's 16-bit DPMI executables. It is also possible to run 32-bit DPMI executables using DOS extenders. The operating system has several improvements relative to MS-DOS, mostly involving support for newer standards and technologies that did not exist when Microsoft ended support for MS-DOS, such as internationalization, or the Advanced Power Management TSRs. Furthermore, with the use of HX DOS Extender, many Windows Console applications function properly in FreeDOS, as do some rare GUI programs, like QEMM and Bochs.

DOS-based Windows 
FreeDOS is able to run Microsoft Windows 1.0 and 2.0 releases. Windows 3.x releases, which had support for i386 processors, cannot fully be run in 386 Enhanced Mode, except partially in the experimental FreeDOS kernel 2037.

Windows 95, Windows 98 and Windows Me use a stripped-down version of MS-DOS. FreeDOS cannot be used as a replacement because the undocumented interfaces between MS-DOS 7.0–8.0 and Windows "4.xx" are not emulated by FreeDOS; however, it can be installed and used beside these systems using a boot manager program, such as BOOTMGR or METAKERN included with FreeDOS.

Windows NT and ReactOS 
Windows NT-based operating systems, including Windows 2000, XP, Vista, 7, 8, 8.1,10 and 11 for desktops, and Windows Server 2003, 2008 and 2008 R2 for servers, do not make use of MS-DOS as a core component of the system. These systems can make use of the FAT file systems which are used by MS-DOS and earlier versions of Windows; however, they typically use the NTFS (New Technology File System) by default for security and other reasons. FreeDOS can co-exist on these systems on a separate partition or on the same partition on FAT systems. The FreeDOS kernel can be booted by adding it to the Windows 2000 or XP's NT Boot Loader configuration file, boot.ini, or the freeldr.ini equivalent for ReactOS.

File systems 

FAT32 is fully supported and is the preferred format for the boot drive. Depending on the BIOS used, up to four Logical Block Addressing (LBA) hard disks of up to 128 GB, or 2 TB, in size are supported. There has been little testing with large disks, and some BIOSes support LBA but produce errors on disks larger than 32 GB; a driver such as OnTrack or EZ-Drive resolves this problem. FreeDOS can also be used with a driver called LFNDOS to enable support for Windows 95-style long file names, but most pre-Windows 95 programs do not support LFNs, even with a driver loaded. There is no planned support for NTFS, ext2 or exFAT, but there are several external third-party drivers available for that purpose. To access ext2 file systems, LTOOLS, a counterpart to Mtools, can sometimes be used to copy data to and from ext2 file system drives.

See also 

 Arachne
 DOSBox
 DOSEMU
 FreeRTOS
 GNU GRUB
 ReactOS
 VFAT

References

External links 

 
 
 FreeDOS Orphanage 

1998 software
DOS variants
Embedded operating systems
Floppy disk-based operating systems
Free software operating systems
Free software programmed in C
Microcomputer software
Operating system distributions bootable from read-only media
Software using the GPL license